The BL 9.2-inch Mk VIII naval gun was designed for the new cordite propellants and was the first British wire-wound gun of this calibre.

Naval service 
The guns were mounted on the s from 1897 until their decommissioning. After they were decommissioned some of the guns were used in coast defence in the UK, and from 1916 on one was mounted on the monitor .

See also 
 List of naval guns

Notes

References 
 Text Book of Gunnery , 1902. London: Printed for His Majesty's Stationery Office, by Harrison and Sons, St. Martin's Lane
 Tony DiGiulian, British 9.2"/40 (23.4 cm) Mark VIII

External links 

 

Naval guns of the United Kingdom
234 mm artillery
Victorian-era weapons of the United Kingdom
World War I naval weapons of the United Kingdom